James Watson Oppy (8 March 1921 – 24 July 2011) was an Australian rules footballer who played with Melbourne in the Victorian Football League (VFL).

Family
The son of James Thomas Oppy (1893-1935) and Doris Edna Oppy, née Watson (1895-1967), James Watson Oppy, known as "Jim", was born on 8 March 1921. He was the older brother of Richmond player Max Oppy and cousin of Dick Reynolds, Tom Reynolds, and murdered lawyer Keith William Allan.

Notes

External links 

1921 births
Australian rules footballers from Victoria (Australia)
Melbourne Football Club players
2011 deaths
People from Maryborough, Victoria